is a Japanese politician of the Liberal Democratic Party, a member of the House of Representatives in the Diet (national legislature). A native of Aizuwakamatsu, Fukushima and graduate of Komazawa University, he was elected to the first of his two terms in the city assembly of Aizuwakamatsu in 1982, to the first of his four terms in the assembly of Fukushima Prefecture and to the first of his terms in the House of Representatives in 2005.

Right-wing positions
He was a supporter of right-wing filmmaker Satoru Mizushima's 2007  film The Truth about Nanjing, which denied that the Nanking Massacre ever occurred.

References

External links 
 Official website in Japanese.

Members of the House of Representatives (Japan)
Koizumi Children
Politicians from Fukushima Prefecture
Living people
1952 births
Liberal Democratic Party (Japan) politicians
Komazawa University alumni